Hermann Lackner (born 26 March 1933) is an Austrian cross-country skier. He competed in the men's 15 kilometre event at the 1964 Winter Olympics.

References

1933 births
Living people
Austrian male cross-country skiers
Olympic cross-country skiers of Austria
Cross-country skiers at the 1964 Winter Olympics
People from Leoben District
Sportspeople from Styria
20th-century Austrian people